South of Dixie is a 1944 American comedy film directed by Jean Yarbrough and written by Clyde Bruckman. The film stars Anne Gwynne, David Bruce, Jerome Cowan, Ella Mae Morse, Joe Sawyer and Samuel S. Hinds. The film was released om June 23, 1944, by Universal Pictures.

Plot

Cast        
Anne Gwynne as Dixie Holister
David Bruce as Danny Lee
Jerome Cowan as Bill 'Brains' Watson
Ella Mae Morse as Barbara Ann Morgan
Joe Sawyer as Ernest Hatcher
Samuel S. Hinds as Col. Andrew J. Morgan
Eddie Acuff as Jay Hatcher
Marie Harmon as Annabella Hatcher
Oscar O'Shea as Col. Hatcher
Louise Beavers as Magnolia Brown / Chloe
Pierre Watkin as Dean Williamson
Bill Bivens as Announcer
Marie Blake as Ruby
Rita Gould as Shoe Customer
Edward Keane as Mr. Platt
Mantan Moreland as The Porter
Ray Walker as Newspaper Reporter
Eddie Bruce as Shoe Salesman
Jack Mulhall as Newspaper Photographer
Bobby Brooks as himself
Lester Cole as himself

References

External links
 

1944 films
American comedy films
1944 comedy films
Universal Pictures films
Films directed by Jean Yarbrough
American black-and-white films
1940s English-language films
1940s American films